Sir Robert William Duff  (8 May 1835 – 15 March 1895), known as Robert William Duff Abercromby until 1862, was a Scottish Liberal Party politician who sat in the House of Commons from 1861 to 1893 and was Governor of New South Wales from 1893 to 1895.

Early life
Duff was born at Fetteresso Castle, Stonehaven, Kincardineshire, son of Arthur Duff (grandson of Robert Duff) and his wife Elizabeth Innes, daughter of John Innes of Kincardine. He was educated at Blackheath School, London. He entered the Royal Navy in 1848, and was made a commander in 1865. He was a Deputy Lieutenant and J.P. for Banffshire (from April 1894) and Kincardineshire (from January 1900).

Political career
Duff served as Liberal Member of Parliament (MP) for Banffshire from 1861 to 1893. He joined Robert Lowe as one of the Adullamites opposing the parliamentary Reform Bill of 1866, which led to the Reform Act 1867. He was a junior Lord of the Treasury and Liberal whip from 1882 to 1885, and Civil Lord of the Admiralty in 1886. He was appointed a Privy Counsellor in 1892.

Governor of New South Wales

Duff was appointed Governor of New South Wales in March 1893 and was subsequently awarded the GCMG. He reached Sydney to take up his duties on 29 May 1893.

His term of office was chiefly marked by his permitting the premier, Sir George Dibbs, to obtain the prorogation of parliament on 8 December 1893, after that minister had incurred a vote of censure. 
In July 1894, after his ministry had failed to carry the general election, Dibbs desired Duff to nominate several persons to the legislative council on his recommendation. 
Duff declined to accede to his wish on the ground that the ministry had been condemned by the colony, and in consequence, Dibbs and his colleagues resigned.

In February 1895, he became ill while visiting Hobart and returned to Government House in Sydney, where he died of multiple liver abscesses and sepsis on 15 March, shortly before his 60th birthday. He was interred in Waverley Cemetery.

Freemasonry
He was a freemason. During his term as governor (1893-1895), he was also Grand Master of the Grand Lodge of New South Wales.

Family
On 21 February 1871, Duff married Louisa, youngest daughter of Sir William Scott, ninth bart. of Ancrum in Roxburghshire. By her, he had three sons, the eldest Robert William, and four daughters.

References

Attribution

External links
 
 
 
 

Governors of New South Wales
Lords of the Admiralty
UK MPs 1859–1865
UK MPs 1865–1868
UK MPs 1868–1874
UK MPs 1874–1880
UK MPs 1880–1885
UK MPs 1885–1886
UK MPs 1886–1892
UK MPs 1892–1895
Members of the Parliament of the United Kingdom for Scottish constituencies
Members of the Privy Council of the United Kingdom
Royal Navy officers
Knights Grand Cross of the Order of St Michael and St George
1835 births
1895 deaths
Australian Freemasons
Masonic Grand Masters
People from Stonehaven
Colony of New South Wales people